Cowbridge Grammar School was one of the best-known schools in Wales until its closure in 1974.  It was replaced by Cowbridge Comprehensive School.

Founded in the 17th century by Sir John Stradling and refounded by Sir Leoline Jenkins, it had close links with Jesus College, Oxford. The school took both boarders and day boys. Famous old boys include actor Anthony Hopkins, poet Alun Lewis and TV presenter Patrick Hannan.

The main school buildings were located in Church Street, Cowbridge.  Derelict for some years, they have now been converted into residential accommodation. The school also occupied part of Old Hall, now an adult education centre.

History

Cowbridge Grammar School was founded in 1608 by Sir John Stradling and owned by Jesus College, Oxford, from 1685 to 1918. Sir Leoline Jenkins, Secretary of State to Charles II, purchased the school and bequeathed it to Jesus College in his will. With the introduction of Intermediate schools in Wales following the Welsh Intermediate Education Act (1889), the school refused to join the scheme. This was even discussed in Parliament. It became Cowbridge Comprehensive School in 1973-4. What used to be the grammar school's main building, dating from 1852, was converted into residential accommodations beginning in 2006 and completed in 2008.

In 1881, Edward Treharne, who represented the school, was chosen to play in the first international game for the Wales rugby union team.

The Grammar School Old Boys' Association, in conjunction with the school's successor, Cowbridge Comprehensive, held a series of activities in September 2008 to mark the 400th anniversary of "the start of quality education" in Cowbridge.

Notable former pupils

The following old boys are listed in date order
Evan Seys (1604–1685) — Attorney general to Cromwell; MP for Glamorgan and Gloucester; Recorder of Gloucester; Exclusionist and Proto-Whig
Leoline Jenkins (1625–1685) — Secretary of State to Charles II; MP for Hythe and for the University of Oxford; Judge of the High Court of the Admiralty; second founder of the school; Principal of Jesus College, Oxford
John Pettingall (1707/8–1781) — Antiquarian and clergyman
David Durell (1728–1775) — Old Testament Scholar; Principal of Hertford College, Oxford; Vice-Chancellor of the University of Oxford
George Cadogan Morgan (1754–1798) — Scientific writer (notably on electricity); republican and dissenting minister
John Nicholl (1759–1838) — Lawyer and politician: Tory MP, Privy Councillor, King's Advocate, Dean of the Arches, Judge of the High Court of the Admiralty
William Nott (1782–1845) — General for the East India Company; Commander in the first Afghan War 1838-42; Resident at Lucknow 
Evan Evans (1813–1891) — Master of Pembroke College; Oxford and Vice-Chancellor of the University of Oxford
Lewis Morris (1833–1907) — Writer and poet; a founder of the University of Wales; radical Liberal
Edward Treharne (1862–1904) — Pioneering Welsh rugby international and medical man
John Lewis Williams (3 January 1882 – 12 July 1916). Welsh rugby international, died at Mametz Wood July 1916
(William John) Andrew Jones (1889–1971) — Colonial administrator (Chief administrator of Northern Territories, Gold Coast)
Glanville Williams (1911–1997) — Professor of English Law at Cambridge
Alun Lewis (1915–1944) — Poet and soldier
Idwal Pugh (1918–2010) — Second Permanent Secretary at Department of the Environment; Ombudsman; Director & Chairman of banks and building societies
J.M.W. Bean (1928–2012) — Medieval historian
Thomas Philip Jones (1931–2000) — Deputy Secretary at Department of Energy; Chairman of the Electricity Council; Company Director
Keith Rowlands (1936–2006) — Welsh rugby international; First Chief Executive Officer of the International Rugby Board
Richard Grassby (born 1936) — Early modern historian
Hedley Benyon (born 1936) - Former president of Rugby Canada
Anthony Hopkins (born 1937) — Actor/film star
Patrick Hannan (1941–2009) — Journalist, author and presenter
Michael Morgan (born 1942) — Scientist
William Tudor John (born 1944) — Deputy Chairman of Nationwide Building Society since 2007; Chairman of Lehman Brothers (Europe) 2000–2008
David Richard Hughes (born 1951) — Newspaper executive and chief leader writer, Daily Telegraph'

External sources

Principal sources:
Peter Cobb, At Cowbridge Grammar School 1949–1966 (Cowbridge Record Society, 2001)
Iolo Davies, A Certaine Schoole (D. Brown & Sons, Cowbridge, 1967)
Richard Lewis, A Certaine Schoole Master: A Portrait of Iolo Davies (Apple Town Publishing, 2012), by an appreciative former pupil. Iolo Davies was Classics Master, boarding master, last Headmaster, and historian of the school.

Extracts, mainly from (auto)biographies:
Brian Ll. James & David J. Francis, Cowbridge and Llanblethian, Past and Present (Stewart Williams, Publishers, Barry, and D. Brown & Sons Ltd, Cowbridge, 1979), Chapter IV, pp. 157–65: Reminiscences by M.B. Edwards, former Deputy Headmaster, on the school in the 1920s. See also Chapter III, pp. 54–8, on the founding of the free (later grammar) school
Patrick Hannan "Hannibal Lecter's Schooldays" Chapter 2 (pp. 38–52) of The Welsh Illusion (Seren 1999). The author recalls his days as a boarder 1952-59. The chapter title says a lot: he makes too much of Anthony Hopkins' being there as well. The tone is journalistically sensational rather than conveying autobiographical, let alone historical accuracy. It is also unfairly anachronistic; but the most entertaining thing written on the school.
L. V. Lester, A Memoir of Hugo Daniel Harper (Longman's, 1896), pp. 8–14: laudatory: see also M. H. Roberts, below
M. H. Roberts, Sherborne, Oxford and Cambridge (Martin Hopkinson Ltd, 1934), pp. 19–22: an all too brief glimpse of the social and love life of the young schoolmaster. (The author was Hugo Daniel Harper's daughter. ) Harper himself was the energetically resuscitating master of the school 1847-50
Michael Feeney Callen, Anthony Hopkins: A Three-Act Life (Robson Books, 2005), pp. 21–9
Quentin Falk, Anthony Hopkins (Virgin Books, 2004), pp. 9–11
Glyn Tegai Hughes, Islwyn (Gwasg Prifysgol Cymru, 2003), pp. 10–12: try out your Welsh
John Pikoulis, Alun Lewis – A Life (Seren, 1991), pp. 19–31
James Marsden, All My Yesterdays (London: Athena, c 2007), pp. 111–60: reminiscences of his time at the school 1956–60 by its first-ever Biology master

Fiction:
Alun Lewis, "Chestnuts" (1936) in C. Archard (ed.), Alun Lewis: Collected Stories'' (Seren, 1990), pp. 289–94. The only fictional treatment yet unearthed of CGS. It gives the texture — coarse — of life in the Boarding House in the early 1930s which was still vivid, even raw, in the recall of the undergraduate author.

References

Grammar School
Educational institutions disestablished in 1974
Grammar schools in Wales
Educational institutions established in the 1600s
Defunct schools in the Vale of Glamorgan
1608 establishments in Wales
Grade II* listed buildings in the Vale of Glamorgan
Grade II* listed schools